Gav Darreh or Gav Dareh may refer to:
 Gav Darreh, Kurdistan
 Gav Darreh, Zanjan